Simultaneous communication, SimCom, or sign supported speech (SSS) is a technique sometimes used by deaf, hard-of-hearing or hearing sign language users in which both a spoken language and a manual variant of that language (such as English and manually coded English) are used simultaneously. While the idea of communicating using two modes of language seems ideal in a hearing/deaf setting, in practice the two languages are rarely relayed perfectly. Often the native language of the user (usually spoken language for the hearing person and sign language for the deaf person) is the language that is strongest, while the non-native language degrades in clarity. In an educational environment this is particularly difficult for deaf children as a majority of teachers who teach the deaf are hearing. Results from surveys taken indicate that communication for students is indeed signing (about 2/3 of the population of students), and that the signing leans more toward English rather than ASL.

History/overview 
Manual communication, including simultaneous communication, has existed for a while in the United States, but gained traction in the 70's. The history of using signing with children has been a tumultuous one, with many swings between discouraging the use of signed languages and focusing on oralism, to the current push of bilingualism in Deaf schools. Ultimately, the majority of schools pushed the signed language they used to focus on English, resulting in the birth of a language that combined spoken language (English) with a manual language. The historical use of SC in schools has been stormy, with professionals (both researchers and teachers alike) on either side of the debate on whether the language is useful or not.

Studies/research

Positive approaches

According to a study done in 1984, it was found that compared with haphazard instruction involving no language approach whatsoever, Total Communication was proved to be beneficial when combined with the correct approach.

One study entitled "Intelligibility of speech produced during simultaneous communication", 12 hearing impaired individuals were asked to audit the audio samples of 4 hearing sign language experts who had produced recordings of a Simultaneous Communication (SC) sample and a Speech Alone (SA) sample. The 12 hearing impaired individuals were asked to then determine which speech produced was clearer. After listening to both audio samples, hearing impaired listeners agreed that both SC and SA were intelligible, which is supported by previous research. Since the intelligibility of the speech was kept on par with English grammar, the study results indicate that SC is a positive tool to use with Deaf and Hard of Hearing children as a language model and for Deaf/Hard of Hearing adults to keep using.

Another study showed the difference between a control group, families who participated in an intervention program that offered services such as classes on Total Communication, private teachers for the child and a deaf adult who came to the families house, and another group of families who used TC, but did not have as much intervention as the control group. The results showed that intervention did work, and that it positively correlated with the communication skills show by the control group's children. The children showed advanced cognitive skills, including comprehension and expression, specifically related to time.

Negative approaches 

A study done in 1990 titled "The Effectiveness of Three Means of Communication in the College Classroom" by Dennis Cokely reviewed research done previously that supported the use of Total Communication (SimCom) in the classroom. However, the study pointed out several restrictive factors that several research tests had not approached. One of the tests administered only compared SimCom, the Rochester Method and speech reading with voice (lip reading), omitting the option of ASL as a means of communication. The 1990 study addressed this issue by comparing SimCom, Sign Alone and Interpretation to see which was the most effective. The results from the comparison showed that signing alone as a way for students to understand information given was the most effective and SimCom was the least effective. Overall, Sign Alone and Interpretation was most effective in all areas of the test, proving that SimCom was a struggle for teachers and students alike. When working with two separate modes of communication, the one that comes naturally for the user will be the more prominent mode. A study conducted in 1998 showed that signing and speaking at the same time results in a slower approach to instruction than if just one modality was used to express language.

Methods of Total Communication 
Listed below are the signed communications that are used within SimCom. Since SimCom can use any spoken language, mainly English, combined with any signed mode, all communication listed below are available for use. 
 American Sign Language
 Signing Exact English
 Cued speech
 Contact sign (Pidgin Sign)
 Total Communication
 Bimodal bilingualism

See also
Key word signing

References

Sign systems
Deafness
Deaf culture
Special education
Education for the deaf